This is a list of French television related events from 1960.

Events
29 March - France wins the 5th Eurovision Song Contest in London, United Kingdom. The winning song is "Tom Pillibi" performed by Jacqueline Boyer.

Debuts
20 October - La Tête et les Jambes (1960-1978)

Television shows

1940s
Le Jour du Seigneur (1949–present)

1950s
Cinq colonnes à la une
Discorama
Le Club du jeudi (1950-1961)
Magazine féminin (1952-1970)
Lectures pour tous (1953-1968)
La Piste aux étoiles (1956-1978)
Voyage sans passeport (1957-1969)

Ending this year
A la découverte des Français
La Boîte à sel (1955-1960)

Births
16 April - Tex, TV presenter

Deaths

See also
1960 in France
List of French films of 1960